Taspine is an alkaloid which acts as a potent acetylcholinesterase inhibitor and cicatrizant. It is found in various plants including Magnolia x soulangeana and Croton lechleri.

The first total synthesis was reported by T. Ross Kelly and Roger L. Xie in 1998.

References 

Acetylcholinesterase inhibitors
Alkaloids found in Euphorbiaceae
Phenethylamine alkaloids
Lactones
Dimethylamino compounds